In the 10th edition of Systema Naturae, Carl Linnaeus classified the arthropods, including insects, arachnids and crustaceans, among his class "Insecta". Insects with net-veined wings were brought together under the name Neuroptera.

Libellula (dragonflies & damselflies)

Libellula quadrimaculata – Four-spotted Chaser
Libellula flaveola – Yellow-winged darter
Libellula vulgata – Vagrant Darter
Libellula rubicunda – Leucorrhinia rubicunda
Libellula depressa – Broad-bodied Chaser
Libellula vulgatissima – Gomphus vulgatissimus
Libellula cancellata – Black-tailed Skimmer
Libellula aenea – Downy Emerald
Libellula grandis – Brown Hawker
Libellula juncea – Common Hawker
Libellula forcipata – Onychogomphus forcipatus
Libellula fasciata & Libellula americana – Zenithoptera fasciata
Libellula umbrata – Erythrodiplax umbrata
Libellula dimidiata – Diastatops dimidiata
Libellula chinensis – Neurobasis chinensis
Libellula virgo – Beautiful Demoiselle
Libellula puella – Azure Damselfly

Ephemera (mayflies)

Ephemera vulgata 
Ephemera bioculata – nomen rejiciendum 
Ephemera culiciformis – Baetis fuscatus 
Ephemera horaria – Caenis horaria 
Ephemera mutica – Alainites muticus 
Ephemera vespertina – Leptophlebia vespertina

Phryganea (caddisflies)

Phryganea phalaenoides – Semblis phalaenoides
Phryganea striata – Oligotricha striata
Phryganea grisea – Limnephilus griseus
Phryganea grandis
Phryganea rhombica – Limnephilus rhombicus
Phryganea bimaculata – Neureclipsis bimaculata
Phryganea flavilatera – Sialis flavilatera
Phryganea bicaudata – Diura bicaudata
Phryganea nigra – Mystacides niger
Phryganea longicornis – Mystacides longicornis
Phryganea filosa – Oecetis ochracea
Phryganea waeneri – Tinodes waeneri
Phryganea albifrons – Athripsodes albifrons
Phryganea bilineata – Athripsodes bilineatus
Phryganea nebulosa – Taeniopteryx nebulosa
Phryganea fusca – Leuctra fusca
Phryganea flava – Limnephilus centralis

Hemerobius (lacewings)

Hemerobius perla & Hemerobius chrysops – Chrysopa perla 
Hemerobius phalaenoides – Drepanopteryx phalaenoides 
Hemerobius formicaleo & Hemerobius formicalynx – Myrmeleon formicarius 
Hemerobius testaceus – Coptotermes testaceus 
Hemerobius marginalis – Rhinotermes marginalis
Hemerobius humulinus
Hemerobius sexpunctatus – Trichadenotecnum sexpunctatum
Hemerobius flavicans – Lachesilla pedicularia
Hemerobius lutarius – Sialis lutaria 
Hemerobius speciosus – Palpares speciosus 
Hemerobius albus – Chrysopidia ciliata 
Hemerobius cornutus – Corydalus cornutus 
Hemerobius pedicularius – Lachesilla pedicularia

Panorpa (scorpionflies)
Panorpa communis 
Panorpa germanica 
Panorpa coa – Nemoptera coa

Raphidia (snakeflies)
Raphidia ophiopsis

Footnotes

References

Systema Naturae
 Systema Naturae, Neuroptera